Maksim Grigoryev may refer to:

 Maxim Grigoriev (author), Swedish writer and translator
 Maksim Grigoryev (basketball), Russian basketball player
 Maksim Grigoryev (footballer, born 1983), Russian footballer
 Maksim Grigoryev (footballer, born 1990), Russian footballer